Helaluzzaman Talukder Lalu  is a Bangladeshi politician and the former Member of Parliament from Bogra-7.

Career
Lalu was elected to Parliament from Bogra-7 as a Bangladesh Nationalist Party candidate in 1991, 1996, 1996, and 2001. He was elected in by-elections which were called after Khaleda Zia won the seat but choose to represent another constituency in the parliament. He is an Advisory Council member of Bangladesh Nationalist Party.

References

Living people
5th Jatiya Sangsad members
6th Jatiya Sangsad members
7th Jatiya Sangsad members
8th Jatiya Sangsad members
Year of birth missing (living people)
Bangladesh Nationalist Party politicians
People from Bogra District